Medina County is the name of two counties in the United States:

 Medina County, Ohio 
 Medina County, Texas